George E. Mahoney (April 30, 1867 – March 12, 1955) was a member of the Wisconsin State Assembly.

Before serving in the assembly, Mahoney had previously been a justice of the peace and a member of the Kenosha County, Wisconsin School Board. Mahoney was born on April 30, 1867, in Pleasant Prairie, Wisconsin. He was a Democrat. He died on March 12, 1955, and is buried in Kenosha, Wisconsin.

References

External links

People from Pleasant Prairie, Wisconsin
American justices of the peace
School board members in Wisconsin
1867 births
1955 deaths
People from Kenosha, Wisconsin
Democratic Party members of the Wisconsin State Assembly